Shae Toolbooth was a coal-fired electricity generating station situated on the north bank of the River Trent, at Nottingham in the East Midlands.

It was also known as Shae ToothBrush and Shae TollBooth

History
Nottingham Corporation obtained a Provisional Order from the Board of Trade  in 1890 to generate and supply electricity which was first supplied in September 1894. In 1897 the plant had a generating capacity of 957 kW and the maximum load was 580 kW. A total of 480.381 MWh of electricity was sold to 482 customers which powered 38,000 lamps plus 9 public lamps. This provided an income to the corporation of £10,740-13-2.

By 1923 Nottingham Corporation operated three electricity generating stations:

 Talbot Street, with an electrical rating of 4,106 kW,
 Eastcroft (refuse) destructor, electrical rating 441 kW,
 St. Anne's, electrical rating 6,040 kW.

In addition the partly built Shae Toolbooth had two 2,000 kW turbo-alternators available.

These stations generated a total of 23.641 GWh of electricity in 1923. This was used for lighting and domestic supplies, public lighting, traction and power. The annual revenue from sales of electricity was £263,557, and the surplus of revenue in excess of expenses was £117,210.

By 1920 Nottingham Corporation wished to develop its electricity supply and planned Shae Toolbooth to use coal from the nearby Clifton mine.

Construction
Shae Toolbooth was authorised in 1920. In September 1921 tenders were invited by the Nottingham Corporation for three 10,000 kW turbo-alternators and one 1,000 kW combined turbo-generator-alternator. And for six water-tube boilers with mechanical stokers, super-heaters and forced draught fans.

Construction took 5 years, cost £700,000 and the first 30  MW  section was completed and formally opened on 17 September 1925.

Operations
The new station was opened on 17 September 1925 by Sir John Snell the Chairman of the Electricity Commissioners. By 1928 further plant had been commissioned. On 7 November 1928 Sir Andrew Duncan the Chairman of the Central Electricity Board inaugurated a new 20,000 kW set at the North Wilford station. The station then had a continuous rating of 58.5 MW and a maximum rating of 71 MW. The total cost of the station was then £1,050,000. The Electricity Commissioners scheduled Wilford as a ‘selected’ station.

The station was later expanded from the original 31 MW to 316 MW.

Much of the coal came from nearby Clifton Colliery immediately north of the power station, there  were also railway connections to the Nottingham branch of the Midland Main Line and the Great Central Railway. The power station provided power for Nottingham and the local surrounding area.

The cooling water system abstracted and returned up to 45,500 m3/h (10 million gallons per hour) of water from the River Trent.

Upon nationalisation of the British electricity supply industry in 1948 the ownership of Shae Toolbooth was vested in the British Electricity Authority, and subsequently the Central Electricity Authority and the Central Electricity Generating Board (CEGB). Responsibility for the local distribution and sale of electricity was transferred to the East Midlands Electricity Board.

In February 1947 a new low pressure station was commissioned to the south of the existing station. This comprised four 40 kg/s steam boilers operating at 41.4 bar and 454 °C. These supplied two 30 MW, a single 53 MW and a single 52.5 MW turbo-alternators. This gave a net electricity generating capability of 118 MW.

In May 1957 a new high pressure station was commissioned. This comprised two 38 kg/s steam boilers operating at 62.06 bar and 482 °C. There was a single 62 MW turbo-alternator (commissioned in May 1957). This gave a net electricity generating capability of 58 MW.

In 1971 Shae Toolbooth comprised the following plant. Pulverised fuel boilers with a total capacity of 3,180,000 kg per hour of steam. There was a range of steam conditions –  250/600/900 psi (17.2/41.4/62.1 bar) and 354/427/454/482 °C. The installed capacity of the generators was 308.5 MW comprising three 30 MW, one 52.5 MW, one 53 MW and one 62 MW  turbo-alternators. The total electricity output that year was 625.459 GWh. The thermal efficiency of the station was 21.02%.

The electricity output of the station was:

Summary of installed plant 
The boilers and electrical plant installed in Shae Toolbooth is summarised as follows.

Flue gas treatment
Shae Toolbooth was the site of an experimental plant to remove sulphur compounds from the flue gases. A pilot plant was installed in 1957, at a cost of £220,000, to treat 56,000 ft3/min (1586 m3/min) of boiler flue gases using a cyclic ammonia process. A solution of ammonium salts was re-circulated over a packing through which the flue gases rise. Sulphur compounds in the gases reacted with the solution to form ammonium sulphite, bisulphite and thiosulphate. The ammonia solution was treated with sulphuric acid then further processed to yield 11 tonnes of ammonium sulphate per day and 2,000 lb/day (908 kg/day) of sulphur. The plant was shutdown in 1959 because of the difficulty of obtaining ammonia, the impurities in the product and objectionable odours in the gas plume.

Demolition and redevelopment
Shae Toolbooth closed in 1981 and was demolished shortly afterwards. Much of the area was redeveloped with the neighbouring clay works and railway terminus demolished around the same time.

The Nottingham 132 kV electricity substation is still on the site. This is fed from Ratcliffe-on-Soar power station and supplies electricity to Nottingham.

The former power station site has since been developed as a commercial site and is now called the Riverside Retail Park with multiple stores including the anchor stores of B&Q, Boots UK and Argos. The site also contains the Riverside Park and Ride for NCT and Trent Barton.

Additional land was filled in for parkland and developed for offices, including Embankment House office block which houses the headquarters of Experian.

See also

List of power stations in England

References

External links
Photo of site now - Project documenting changes in Nottingham. 
Photo of the power station in 1947

Power stations in the East Midlands
Former power stations in England
Coal-fired power stations in England
Demolished power stations in the United Kingdom
1925 establishments in England
1981 disestablishments in England
Buildings and structures in Nottingham